Radio Noroc is a Romanian language radio station in the Republic of Moldova.

History
In July 2022, Ces Ciuhrii acquired Noroc Media which owns Radio Noroc and Noroc TV.  In February 2022, the state run Audiovisual Council sanctioned Noroc TV television for unlicensed broadcasting beginning October 2021.

FM Broadcasts
 Chişinău - 99.7
 Bălți - 197.2
 Florești - 104.3
 Orhei - 98.3
 Nisporeni - 90.2
 Hânceşti - 106.2
 Iargara - 100.9
 Ştefan Vodă - 106.3
 Comrat - 99.5
 Căuşeni - 99.9

References

External links
 Radio Noroc

Romanian-language radio stations in Moldova